I Only Arsked! is a 1958 British comedy film directed by Montgomery Tully and starring Bernard Bresslaw, Michael Medwin and Alfie Bass. It was based on the television series The Army Game and was made by Hammer Films.

Plot
Slapstick ensues when inept army recruits are transferred to a post in the Middle East.

Cast

 Bernard Bresslaw as Private "Popeye" Popplewell
 Michael Medwin as Corporal Springer
 Alfie Bass as Private "Excused Boots" Bisley
 Geoffrey Sumner as Major Upshott-Bagley
 Charles Hawtrey as Private "Professor" Hatchett
 Norman Rossington as Private "Cupcake" Cook
 David Lodge as Sergeant "Potty" Chambers
 Arthur Howard as Sir Redvers
 Marne Maitland as King Fazim
 Michael Bentine as Fred
 Francis Matthews as Mahmoud
 Michael Ripper as Azim
 Wolfe Morris as Salaman
 Ewan MacDuff as  Ferrers
 Claire Gordon as Harem girl
 Marie Devereux as Harem girl

Critical reception
Allmovie wrote, "The level of humor in I Only Arsked! will perhaps best be appreciated by fans of the original series"; while TV Guide noted "An enjoyable British slapstick comedy."

Box Office
According to Kinematograph Weekly the film performed "better than average" at the British box office in 1959.

References

External links

1958 films
British comedy films
1958 comedy films
Films directed by Montgomery Tully
Films based on television series
Films scored by Benjamin Frankel
Military humor in film
Hammer Film Productions films
The Army Game
Films with screenplays by Sid Colin
Films set in the Middle East
1950s English-language films
1950s British films
English-language comedy films